The Yermak Stone is a cliff in Kungursky District of Perm Krai, at the territory of Preduralye Reserve. It is situated at the right bank of Sylva River opposite the Chikali Station. It consists of limestone and has peaks of different height which are called Yermak, Yermachikha and Yermachonok.

Inside the rock there is a cave, where, by legends, Yermak Timofeyevich spent the winter and hid his treasures there.

Yermak Stone is a traditional place for mountain climbing competition. Every year, May 9, the Perm city competition takes place there.

In literature 

Yermak Stone is mentioned in the story "Boitsy" by Dmitry Mamin-Sibiryak:

External links 
 The Yermak Stone photos.

References 

Landforms of Perm Krai
Landforms of Russia
Cliffs of Europe